The Palawan spiny rat (Maxomys panglima) is a species of rodent in the family Muridae.
It is found only in the Philippines.

References

Rats of Asia
Maxomys
Endemic fauna of the Philippines
Fauna of Palawan
Rodents of the Philippines
Near threatened animals
Vulnerable fauna of Asia
Mammals described in 1921
Taxonomy articles created by Polbot